The Latin Grammy Award for Best Tropical Song is an honor presented annually at the Latin Grammy Awards, a ceremony that recognizes excellence and creates a wider awareness of cultural diversity and contributions of Latin recording artists in the United States and internationally. The award is reserved to the songwriters of a new song containing at least 51% of the lyrics in Spanish. Instrumental recordings or cover songs are not eligible. Songs in Portuguese may be entered in the Brazilian field.

The award was first presented to Juan Luis Guerra for the song "El Niágara en Bicicleta" at the 1st Latin Grammy Awards held in 2000. He is also the most awarded performer in this category, winning on every occasion he's been nominated, a total of five times. His song "La Llave de mi Corazón" also won the award for Song of the Year in 2007, becoming the first tropical song to do so. Apart from Guerra other multiple winners include Sergio George and Jorge Villamizar, both with two wins.

Colombian songwriters have won this award a total of seven times, more than any other nationality. It has  been won by songwriters  from the Dominican Republic six times, the United States three times and Puerto Rico once.

Winners and nominees

2000s

2010s

2020s

 Each year is linked to the article about the Latin Grammy Awards held that year.
 The performing artist is only listed but does not receive the award.
 Showing the name of the songwriter(s), the nominated song and in parentheses the performer's name(s).

See also
Latin Grammy Award for Song of the Year
Latin Grammy Award for Best Traditional Tropical Album
Latin Grammy Award for Best Contemporary Tropical Album

References

General
  Note: User must select the "Tropical Field" category as the genre under the search feature.

Specific

External links
Official website of the Latin Grammy Awards

 
Song awards
Latin Grammy
Song
Tropical Song
Awards established in 2000
Songwriting awards